The Seattle Mariners are a Major League Baseball (MLB) franchise based in Seattle, Washington. They play in the American League West division. The first game of the new baseball season for a team is played on Opening Day, and being named the Opening Day starter is an honor, which is often given to the player who is expected to lead the pitching staff that season, though there are various strategic reasons why a team's best pitcher might not start on Opening Day. The Mariners have used 15 different Opening Day starting pitchers in their 41 seasons. The 15 starters have a combined Opening Day record of 15 wins, 13 losses (15–13) and 13 no decisions. No decisions are only awarded to the starting pitcher if the game is won or lost after the starting pitcher has left the game.

Félix Hernández has the Mariners' record for most Opening Day starts with eleven, recording a record of 7–2. Randy Johnson has the most starts in the former home ballpark of the Mariners, the Kingdome, compiling an Opening Day record of 2–0 in 6 starts. Jamie Moyer has the most starts in Safeco Field, the Mariners' current home ballpark, and has an Opening Day record of 1–2. Mark Langston has the worst winning percentage as the Opening Day starting pitcher with a record of 0–3, all of which were pitched on the road.

Overall, the Mariners' starters have a record of 7–4 at the Kingdome on Opening Day, compared to a 4–3 record at Safeco Field, making their combined home record 11–7, and their away record 6–6. Randy Johnson, Jeff Fassero, Jamie Moyer, and Freddy García were the Opening Day starting pitchers those years, and had a combined Opening Day record of 2–1.

Key

Pitchers

References 

Opening Day Starters
Lists of Major League Baseball Opening Day starting pitchers